Tsepo Seturumane (born 6 July 1992) is Mosotho international footballer who plays for Lioli as a striker. He played at the 2014 FIFA World Cup qualification.

International career

International goals
Scores and results list Lesotho's goal tally first.

Notes

References

External links
 

1992 births
Living people
Lesotho footballers
Lesotho international footballers
Association football forwards